Palazzo degli Alberti (local: Casone degli Alberti) is a historical building in the center of Prato, Tuscany, central Italy (2, Via Degli Alberti). It was the seat of Cassa di Risparmio di Prato (the saving bank of Prato, Cariprato, now part of the Banca Popolare di Vicenza) and was home to the former's large art collection. In 2013 it was reported that Banca Popolare di Vicenza moved all the collection to Vicenza after liquidated Cariprato.

The former owner of Cariprato, Fondazione Cassa di Risparmio di Prato, continued to use the building as headquarter.

History

The palace originated in the 13th century, as testified by traces of loggiati and openings (later closed) in its façade, dating from that period and made of pietra alberese, a kind of Tuscan limestone.

The current appearance of the façade is from later restorations, performed in the late 15th-early 16th centuries. Features from this period include the portal, the windows and the two decorative frames. At the palace's corner is a stone coat of arms of the Bardi di Vernio family, to which, among the others, belonged Cosimo de' Medici's wife, Contessina de' Bardi.

The Cassa di Risparmio di Prato, founded in 1830, moved its seat here in 1870. In the following year the building was restored and enlarged, until it reached its current size.

During 2020, the Banco Intesa separated the entrance to the bank branch and the entrance to the exhibition space.

Art gallery
Palazzo degli Alberti was home to the art gallery of the Cassa di Risparmio di Prato, with the most famous work of the collection being The Crowning with Thorns, attributed to Caravaggio (c. 1604).

The bulk of the collection is formed by Tuscan Baroque paintings from the 17th-18th century: the artists represented include  Matteo Rosselli (Moses Saved from the Waters), Jacopo Vignali, Giovanni Battista Vanni, Francesco Furini (David and Goliath), Giovanni Bilivert (Angelica and Roger), Carlo Dolci, Cesare, Vincenzo and Pietro Dandini, Justus Sustermans (Portrait of Vittoria della Rovere, Livio Mehus, Francesco Conti, Giovanni Martinelli and Cosimo Salvestrini.

Renaissance paintings include a Madonna with Child (c. 1436) by a young Filippo Lippi, a Crucifixion(c. 1505) by Giovanni Bellini, as well as works by Santi di Tito. There is also a sculpture group by the Pratese artist Lorenzo Bartolini.

References

Art museums and galleries in Tuscany
Alberti
Renaissance architecture in Tuscany